is a Japanese actor and voice actor from Chiba Prefecture, Japan. Daisuke is probably most known for the roles as Colonnello in Reborn! and Yamato Akitsuki in Suzuka.

Filmography

Stage
 Three Sisters

Anime
 Honey and Clover (Key Animation)
 Karin (Key Animation)
 R.O.D the TV (Key Animation (ep. 2,3))
 Reborn! (Voice of Colonnello)
 Mamotte! Lollipop (Voice of Ichii)
 Suzuka (Voice of Yamato Akitsuki)
 Yu-Gi-Oh! GX (Voiced of Chick, Laughter Mask (Yamanaka), N-Air Hummingbird)
 Kekkaishi (Voice of Haroku (ep. 28–29))
 Kämpfer (Key Animation)
 Mobile Suit Gundam 00 (Key Animation (ep.21))
 Code Geass: Lelouch of the Rebellion (Key Animation (ep. 21))

OVA
 The Prince of Tennis: The National Tournament (Voice of Yuujirou Kai)

Drama CDs
 Oresama Teacher (Yamashita Takumi)

External links

1985 births
Living people
Japanese male stage actors
Japanese male video game actors
Japanese male voice actors
Male voice actors from Chiba Prefecture
Mausu Promotion voice actors
21st-century Japanese male actors